Hope of the States were an English post rock-influenced indie band from Chichester.

History
The band formed in 2000, naming themselves after The Shame of the States, Albert Deutsch's 1948 book on the state of mental healthcare in the United States. They were discovered after sending a demo to the Planet Sound teletext page, and were signed to Sony BMG. Scott R. Walker left the band after the first initial releases and then went on to form KASMs.  The band's guitarist James Lawrence committed suicide in January 2004, shortly before the release of their first album, The Lost Riots, which reached the Top 40 in the UK Albums Chart. The band's first single, "Black Dollar Bills", was packaged in a hessian sleeve, each hand-sewn by a band member. The band's most extensive UK tour started in October 2004, beginning with a date in Belfast's Mandela Hall, including an appearance at the Dance Academy in Plymouth.

Much of 2005 was spent recording the follow-up to The Lost Riots, and the band only made six live appearances. The band performed some songs to be included on their second album at an acoustic performance in London. The band worked with fansite "The Halfway Home" to produce an advent calendar for Christmas 2005. The only studio recording released in 2005 was the track 'Shalom', included as Day 24 on the calendar.

In April 2006 the band released a new EP, Blood Meridian, accompanied by a low-key UK tour beginning in The Cockpit in Leeds. The EP was limited to 2,000 copies, available on vinyl, and was also available for download. The single "Sing it Out" was released in June 2006, reaching No. 39 in the UK Singles Chart, and their second album Left followed on 19 June.

The band appeared at T in the Park on 8 July, and then the Reading and Leeds Festivals in August, where they played on the BBC Radio 1/NME stage.  During their set on 27 August at Reading, it emerged it may be their last ever show as the band were splitting up. This was suggested further later in the day by friends Broken Social Scene, who dedicated their festival set to the band. On 30 August, Sam Herlihy made a statement on the band's forum confirming the split and that Reading was their last show.

Following the band's split, Sam Herlihy and Simon Jones formed The Northwestern, who split in 2012. The rest of the band formed Troubles, with Michael Hibbert leaving in 2007 to form Chapel Club, who split in 2013.

Members
 Sam Herlihy – vocals, guitar, piano, music boxes, glockenspiels, mellotron, sampler, celeste, harmonium
 Michael Hibbert – guitar, harmonica,  backing vocals
 Simon Jones – drums, percussion, glockenspiel, backing vocals
 Mike Siddell – violin, farfisa, glockenspiel, backing vocals
 Anthony Theaker – guitar, piano, hammond organ, farfisa, celeste, laptop, music box, moog synthesizer, glockenspiel, mellotron
 Paul Wilson – bass guitar, backing vocals

Former members
 Jimmi Lawrence – guitar
 Keith Seymour – bass guitar
 Scott R Walker – bass guitar

Discography

Studio albums

Extended plays

Singles

Demos and promotional singles
 Untitled 8-track demo (CDR; not 9 tracks, as some sources suggest)
 Untitled 2-track demo (Black Dollar Bills/Three Days In The West; CDR)
 Untitled "Fingerprints" demo (CD limited to 10 copies)
 "AMM=IBM" (MP3 download)
 "L'Ark Pour Les Enfants Terribles" (December 2004; ltd. tour CD)

See also
 The Northwestern (band)

References

External links
 
 
 Audiojunkies Interview with Hope of the States

English indie rock groups
Musical groups established in 2000
Musical groups disestablished in 2006
Chichester
English post-rock groups